Archips gyraleus is a species of moth of the family Tortricidae first described by Alexey Diakonoff in 1982. It is found in Sri Lanka.

Description
The wingspan of the adult male is 17 mm. Head and thorax deep grayish ferruginous. Palpus long and slender. Thorax with a small apical tuft. Abdomen ferruginous gray. Anal tuft pale ocherous orange. Forewings with closely approximated veins 7 and 8. Forewings are oblong subtriangular. Costa sinuate. Apex pointed and prominent. Termen distinctly sinuate. Tornus purplish vinaceous (purplish mixed with the color of red wine) and rounded. Markings of forewings deeply purplish ferruginous, which becomes darker purple upwards towards costa. Two blackish apical points present. Cilia ferruginous, with light ocherous basal half, deep purple around apex. Hindwings glossy light golden vinaceous. Apical half of hindwing paler golden. Cilia pale fulvous, darker around apex.

References

Moths described in 1982
Archips
Moths of Asia